Follow Me is the third album by Bearfoot, released in 2006.

Development 
The album was the first the group released under their new name of Bearfoot, while their first two albums were released under the name of Bearfoot Bluegrass. According to Bearfoot's mandolin player Jason Norris, they shortened their name to reflect the band's present sound. "We'd never had a banjo in the band and it was hard to call ourselves a traditional bluegrass band.".  The band showcases warm ensemble playing, featuring three part vocal harmony, and intertwined twin-fiddle leads. All five musicians take turns singing, sometimes in harmony, sometimes solo, backed by fiddles, guitar, and mandolin.  The album was cut live, meaning the rhythm track was recorded in a big room with everyone in the circle. The twin fiddles had to be recorded live because they played off of each other. The solo parts were left out of the rhythm track, and filled in later. Annalisa sang live lead vocals on a few of the tracks.  Annalisa Tornfelt stands out on this album with her voice and song writing.

Track listing

Personnel
Bearfoot
Annalisa Tornfelt – Lead Vocals (1, 2, 3, 4, 6, 9), Baritone Vocals (10), High Baritone Vocals, Fiddle (right), Guitar (4, 9)
Angela Oudean – Baritone Vocals (1), Tenor Vocals (5, 7), Fiddle (left), Fiddle (4)
Kate Hamre – Lead Vocals (10), Baritone Vocals (3), Tenor Vocals, Acoustic Bass
Mike Mickelson – Lead Vocals (5), Guitar (3)
Jason Norris – Lead Vocals (7), Baritone Vocals (6), Mandolin

References

External links

2006 albums
Bearfoot (American band) albums